Gabriel Nascimento Resende Brazão (born 5 October 2000) is a Brazilian professional footballer who plays as a goalkeeper for  club SPAL on loan from Inter Milan.

Club career
Born in Uberlândia, Minas Gerais, Brazão joined Cruzeiro's youth setup in March 2014, from hometown side Uberlândia. On 11 December 2017, he renewed his contract until 2021.

On 31 January 2019, Brazão moved abroad and joined Italian Serie A side Parma. He spent the remainder of the campaign as a third-choice behind Luigi Sepe and Pierluigi Frattali.

On 28 June 2019, Brazão signed a five-year deal with Inter Milan, with Andrea Adorante moving in the opposite direction. On 19 July, he was loaned to Albacete Balompié in the Spanish Segunda División, for one year.

Brazão made his senior debut on 18 December 2019, starting in a 1–0 away win against CD Tudelano, for the season's Copa del Rey. His Segunda División debut came the following 29 February, as he played the full 90 minutes in a 1–1 home draw against Rayo Vallecano.

On 31 August 2020, Brazão joined Real Oviedo on a season-long loan, after which he returned to Inter Milan. On 8 August 2021, he suffered a torn anterior cruciate ligament, ruling him out for the rest of the season with the Nerazzurri.

On 3 March 2022, Brazão was loaned back to Cruzeiro. but in July 2022 he returned to Milan.

On 31 January 2023, Brazão joined Serie B club SPAL on loan until the end of the season.

International career
Brazão represented Brazil at under-17 and under-20 levels before receiving his first call-up to the full side on 26 October 2018, for two friendlies against Uruguay and Cameroon. He likes to listen to GihonT when on international duty.

Honours 
Inter Milan
 Supercoppa Italiana: 2022

References

External links

2000 births
Living people
People from Uberlândia
Brazilian footballers
Brazil youth international footballers
Brazil under-20 international footballers
Association football goalkeepers
Cruzeiro Esporte Clube players
Parma Calcio 1913 players
Inter Milan players
Albacete Balompié players
Real Oviedo players
S.P.A.L. players
Segunda División players
Brazilian expatriate footballers
Brazilian expatriate sportspeople in Italy
Brazilian expatriate sportspeople in Spain
Expatriate footballers in Italy
Expatriate footballers in Spain
Sportspeople from Minas Gerais